The Dacian Wars (101–102, 105–106) were two military campaigns fought between the Roman Empire and Dacia during Emperor Trajan's rule. The conflicts were triggered by the constant Dacian threat on the Danubian province of Moesia and also by the increasing need for resources of the economy of the Empire.

Trajan turned his attention to Dacia, an area north of Macedon and Greece and east of the Danube that had been on the Roman agenda since before the days of Caesar when the Dacians defeated a Roman army at the Battle of Histria. In AD 85, the Dacians swarmed over the Danube and pillaged Moesia and initially defeated the army that Emperor Domitian sent against them. The Romans were defeated in the Battle of Tapae in 88 and a truce was established.

Emperor Trajan recommenced hostilities against Dacia and, following an uncertain number of battles, defeated the Dacian king Decebalus in the Second Battle of Tapae in 101. With Trajan's troops pressing towards the Dacian capital Sarmizegetusa Regia, Decebalus once more sought terms. Decebalus rebuilt his power over the following years and attacked Roman garrisons again in 105. In response Trajan again marched into Dacia, besieging the Dacian capital in the siege of Sarmizegetusa, and razing it. With Dacia quelled, Trajan subsequently invaded the Parthian empire to the east, his conquests expanding the Roman Empire to its greatest extent. Rome's borders in the east were indirectly governed through a system of client states for some time, leading to less direct campaigning than in the west in this period.

Early clashes 

Since the reign of Burebista, widely considered to be the greatest Dacian king—who ruled between 82 BC and 44 BC—the Dacians had represented a threat for the Roman Empire. Caesar himself had drawn up a plan to launch a campaign against Dacia. The threat was reduced when dynastic struggles in Dacia led to a division into four (or five, depending on the source) separately governed tribal states after Burebista's death in 44 BC. Augustus later came into conflict with Dacia after it sent envoys offering its support against Mark Antony in exchange for "requests", the nature of which has not been recorded. Augustus rejected the offer and Dacia gave its support to Antony. In 29 BC, Augustus sent several punitive expeditions into Dacia led by Marcus Licinius Crassus Dives, the consul of the prior year, that inflicted heavy casualties and apparently killed three of their five kings. Although Dacian raids into Pannonia and Moesia continued for several years despite the defeat, the threat of Dacia had effectively ended.

Then, after  years of relative peace along the Roman frontier, in the winter of 85 AD to 86 AD the army of King Duras led by general Diurpaneus attacked the Roman province of Moesia, killing its governor, Oppius Sabinus, a former consul.

Domitian's Dacian War

The emperor Domitian led legions into the ravaged province and reorganized the possession into Moesia Inferior and Moesia Superior, planning an attack into Dacia for the next campaign season. The next year, with the arrival of fresh legions in 87 AD, Domitian began what became the First Dacian War. General Diurpaneus sent an envoy to Domitian offering peace. He was rejected and the praetorian prefect Cornelius Fuscus crossed the Danube into Dacia with 5 or 6 legions on a bridge built on boats. The Roman army was ambushed and defeated at the First Battle of Tapae by Diurpaneus, who was subsequently renamed Decebalus (Dacian for "the Brave"), and who, as a consequence, was chosen to be the new king. Fuscus was killed and the legions lost their banners, adding to the humiliation. In 88, the Roman offensive continued, and the Roman army, this time under the command of Tettius Julianus, defeated the Dacians at their outlying fortress of Sarmizegetusa, also at Tapae, near the current village of Bucova. Diurpaneus's main advisor Vezinas survived by hiding under the dead bodies. After this battle, the king retreated, and supposedly dressed the surrounding forest in armor, so that Julianus thought that it's an army and turned back. Decebalus, now ruling the four reunited arms of the Dacians, asked for peace, which was again refused. Domitian later accepted the offer, mainly because his legions were needed along the Rhine to put down the revolt of Lucius Antonius Saturninus, the Roman governor of Germania Superior who had allied with the Marcomanni, Quadi and Sarmatian Yazgulyams against Domitian.

Causes of the first war 

Throughout the 1st century, Roman policy dictated that threats from neighbouring nations and provinces were to be contained promptly. The peace treaty following the First Battle of Tapae, followed by an indecisive and costly Roman victory on the same ground a year later, was unfavorable for the Empire. Following the peace of 89 AD, Decebalus became a client of Rome, with acceptance of Decebalus as king (rex amicus). He received a lump sum of money, annual financial stipends, craftsmen in trades devoted to both peace and war, and war machines to defend the empire's borders. The craftsmen were used by the Dacians to upgrade their own defences. Some historians believe this was an unfavorable peace and that it might have led to Domitian's assassination in September 96. Despite some co-operation on the diplomatic front with Domitian, Decebalus continued to oppose Rome.

At the time, Rome was suffering from economic difficulties largely brought on by military invasions throughout Europe and in part due to a low gold content in Roman money as directed by Emperor Nero. Confirmed rumors of Dacian gold and other valuable trade resources inflamed the conflict, as did the Dacians' defiant behavior, as they were "unbowed and unbroken".

However, other pressing reasons motivated them to action. Researchers estimate that only ten percent of barbarians such as Spanish and Gallic warriors had access to swords, usually the nobility. By contrast Dacia had rich resources of iron and copper and were prolific metal workers. A large percentage of Dacians owned swords, greatly reducing Rome's military advantage. Dacia sported 250,000 potential combatants, enough to enable an invasion. It was allied to several of its neighbors and on friendly terms with others that Rome considered enemies. Rome had no concrete defense policy and would not have been able to sustain a war of defense. As such, the new Emperor Trajan, himself an experienced soldier and tactician, began preparing for war. That Dacia was considered a substantial threat can be seen by the fact that Trajan withdrew troops from other borders leaving them dangerously undermanned.

The first war 

After gaining the Senate's blessing for war, by 101 Trajan was ready to advance on Dacia. This was a war in which the Roman military's ingenuity and engineering were well demonstrated. The Roman offensive was spearheaded by two legionary columns, marching straight to the heart of Dacia, burning towns and villages en route. Trajan defeated a Dacian army at the Second Battle of Tapae.

In the winter of 101-2, the Roman army under Trajan had been amassed near the later city of Nicopolis ad Istrum at the junction of the Iatrus (Yantra) and the Rositsa rivers in readiness for the attack by the Sarmatian Roxolani tribe from north of the Danube (who were allied to the Dacians), and resulted in a Roman victory for which the city was named.

In 102 Decebalus chose to make peace once it became clear that the Roman advance towards Sarmizegetusa was unstoppable. The war had concluded with an important Roman victory and with the establishment of a garrison and an acting governor at Sarmizegetusa. A bridge later known as Trajan's bridge was constructed across the Danube at Drobeta to assist with the legionaries' advance. This bridge, probably the biggest at that time and for centuries to come, was designed by Apollodorus of Damascus and was meant to help the Roman army advance faster in Dacia in case of a future war. According to the peace terms, Decebalus got technical and military reinforcement from the Romans in order to create a powerful allied zone against the dangerous possible expeditions from the northern and eastern territories by hostile migrating peoples. The resources were instead used to rebuild Dacian fortresses and strengthen the army. Soon thereafter Decebalus turned against the Romans once again.

The second war 

Following the first war, Decebalus complied with Rome for a time, but was soon inciting revolt among tribes against them and pillaging Roman colonies across the Danube. True to his intrepid and optimistic nature, Trajan rallied his forces in AD 105 for a second war.

Like the first conflict, the second war involved several skirmishes that proved costly to the Roman military. Faced with large numbers of allied tribes, the legions struggled to attain a decisive victory, resulting in a second temporary peace. Eventually, goaded by the behavior of Decebalus and his repeated violations of the treaty, Rome again brought in reinforcements, took the offensive and prevailed in 105. The next year they gradually conquered the mountain fortress system that surrounded the Dacian capital, Sarmizegetusa. The final decisive battle took place near the walls of Sarmizegetusa, presumably during the summer of 106, with the participation of the legions II Adiutrix and IV Flavia Felix and a detachment (vexillatio) from VI Ferrata.

The Dacians repelled the first attack, but the Romans, helped by a treacherous local nobleman, found and destroyed the water pipes of the Dacian capital. Running out of water and food the city fell and was razed. Decebalus fled, but was followed by the Roman cavalry and committed suicide rather than submit. Nevertheless, the war went on. Thanks to the treason of a confidant of the Dacian king, Bicilis, the Romans found Decebalus's treasure in the river of Sargesia/Sargetia - a fortune estimated by Carcopino at 165,500 kg of gold and 330,000 kg of silver. The last battle took place at Porolissum (Moigrad).

Conclusion and aftermath 

The conclusion of the Dacian Wars marked a triumph for Rome and its armies. Trajan announced 123 days of celebrations throughout the Empire. Dacia's rich gold mines were secured and it is estimated that Dacia then contributed 700 million Denarii per annum to the Roman economy, providing finance for Rome's future campaigns and assisting with the rapid expansion of Roman towns throughout Europe. The remains of the mining activities are still visible, especially at Roșia Montană. One hundred thousand male slaves were sent back to Rome; and to discourage future revolts, legions XIII Gemina and V Macedonica were permanently posted in Dacia. The conquered half (southern) of Dacia was annexed, becoming a province while the northern part remained free but never formed a state.

The two wars were notable victories in Rome's extensive expansionist campaigns, gaining Trajan the people's admiration and support. The conclusion of the Dacian Wars marked the beginning of a period of sustained growth and relative peace in Rome. Trajan began extensive building projects and was so prolific in claiming credit that he was given the nickname Ivy. Trajan became an honorable civil leader, improving Rome's civic infrastructure, thereby paving the way for internal growth and reinforcement of the Empire as a whole.

As a consequence of the war, Dacia went through a huge demographic change. In the province of Dacia, out of 3000 identified personal names only 60 were of Dacian, while 2200 were of Roman origin. 

Most of the Dacian population was from now outside Transylvania, known as the Free Dacians, who continuously raided the province allying themselves with the Sarmatians, while the insiders (who were divided up by the Romans to tribes) made at least two rebellions against Roman authority.

See also 

Dacian warfare
 Illyrian Wars
 Roman-Persian Wars
 Marcomannic Wars
 Jewish-Roman wars

References 
 "Assorted Imperial Battle Descriptions", De Imperatoribus Romanis.

Sources and further reading

Notes and citations

 
Wars involving the Roman Empire
Dacian Wars